Bealach na Bà (pronounced ) is a winding single track road through the mountains of the Applecross peninsula, in Wester Ross in the Scottish Highlands. The Bealach na Bà is just one feature on this road, being its highest point and site of several corries.

The historic mountain pass was built in 1822 and is engineered similarly to roads through the great mountain passes in the Alps, with very tight hairpin bends that switch back and forth up the hillside and gradients that approach 20%.

The name is Scottish Gaelic for Pass of the Cattle, as it was historically used as a drovers' road. 

The Bealach, as it is known for short, is considered unsuitable for learner drivers and very large vehicles. The route is often impassable in winter. According to Country Life, "the single-track, historic drovers' lane travels up, down and around hairpins through the mountains of the remote Applecross peninsula as if they were the Alps and, at Bealach na Bà ('pass of the cattle'), features the steepest ascent of any road in the UK".

In popular culture
The road featured in the television series Hamish Macbeth (much of which was filmed in nearby Plockton), which pictures it having a road sign that indicates: "Narrow road - no more than three sheep abreast". The road was also featured in the 1953 film Laxdale Hall.

Cycling
Since 2006 a pair of cyclosportive cycling events has been staged in the surrounding region, and over the pass. The  Bealach Beag event is held each May, and the  Bealach Mòr event is held each September.

Climate

External links

Bealach na Bà on kishornonline.co.uk Wayback Machine archive of 7 January 2017
Highlights of Scotland - the Bealach na Bà
Scotland: the Movie Location Guide -Laxdale Hall, Bealach na Bà
Hands on Events - organisers of  Bealach na Bà cyclosportive events

References 

Mountain passes of Scotland
Roads in Scotland
Ross and Cromarty
Scenic routes in the United Kingdom
Transport in Highland (council area)